Whistler is a teen drama series created by Kelly Senecal. It aired on CTV in Canada and on Noggin's teen-oriented programming block, The N, in the United States. It was the first hour-long drama on The N. The series centres on the aftermath of the mysterious death of a local snowboard legend in Whistler, British Columbia. It aired for two seasons from 2006 to 2008.

Premise
The show begins when Beck McKaye (David Paetkau of Final Destination 2 and Flashpoint) returns home from the 2006 Winter Olympics with a gold medal. Upon his death, the show explores the lives of his friends and family—all of whom have stories to tell and secrets to keep.

The secret-keeping locals are the only ones who can answer the terrifying truth of the show's tagline, "What secrets lie beneath the snow?" McKaye's friends and family each have their own stories, as well as secrets they attempt to hide as the show progresses.
In particular, Beck's brother Quinn (Moss) must try to solve the mystery of Beck's death.

Following the solution of Beck's death at the end of the first season, the series' second season shifts the focus to the lives and adventures of both returning and new characters. The McKayes, Varlands and Millers have put the pieces of their lives together and are ready to make a new start. Quinn steps out from his brother's shadow to carve out a name for himself on the mountain, while his mother comes to terms with her past and earns a future for herself. The Varlands fight to overcome their dark history and regain control of Whistler, while the Millers make new discoveries that may upset the balance of power. The show's second season tagline is "What new secrets lie hidden beneath the snow? The truth is hard to find. In Whistler it's just about impossible."

Production

For season one, some of the outdoor shots used in the series were filmed in and around Whistler, but most of the outdoor (and all of the indoor) scenes were filmed at Uphill Studios in Langley, B.C., about 45 km (27 mi) southeast of Vancouver. For season two, significantly more of the outdoor filming was done in Whistler. All of the post-production was done in Vancouver by Rainmaker Post, formerly a division of Rainmaker Entertainment and now a division of Deluxe Entertainment Services.

On August 1, 2006, a lawsuit was filed against CTV by Olympic snowboarder Ross Rebagliati, accusing the network of "misappropriating" his identity with Whistler's main character Beck McKaye. The suit was settled out-of-court on April 24, 2008.

Television air dates 
Whistler premiered on CTV on June 25, 2006, and on The N in the United States on June 30, 2006.

The show aired in Canada on Sunday nights at 10 pm local time until August 14 when CTV announced it was moving the series to Monday nights at 9 pm local time. However, after just one airing in that time slot, CTV returned the series to Sunday nights at 10 pm, effective with the August 20 telecast. CTV aired the final two episodes of season one back to back on Friday, August 25.

From November 25, 2006, to February 3, 2007, CTV rebroadcast the series on Saturdays at 10 pm local time and Sunday afternoons at 4 pm local time. The CTV rebroadcast of the series pilot "Fallen" was an alternate version that included a slightly different opening scene, a different main title segment and some minor editing of a few other scenes.

The N continued to air only one episode a week in the United States, eventually shifting the final five episodes to Saturday mornings at 1 am before completing the series on September 23. The station began re-airing the series on Monday, January 22, 2007, at 5 am but for unexplained reasons omitted airing the first episode "Fallen" and began with the second episode "Out of the Shadows".

The series also aired on the British youth channel Trouble beginning October 16, 2006, on Monday nights at 9 pm and on the Polish catholic channel Puls on Saturday and Sunday evenings at 6:20 pm. French-language broadcasts of Whistler aired from January 30 to April 29, 2007, on a Canadian cable channel, Séries Plus Tuesday nights at 8 pm.

Season 2 began filming on January 8, 2007, and was completed on May 23, 2007. As with the first season, there were 13-second-season episodes. These were aired in Canada by CTV beginning on September 29, 2007, on Saturday nights at 9 pm and concluded on December 15, 2007. Repeats began on Saturday, December 28, 2007.

The N was confirmed as a co-producer and American rights holder for the second season, but opted not to air it on its network for unknown reasons.

Séries Plus in Canada began airing Season 2 in French on Wednesday nights at 8 pm beginning January 9, 2008.

Trouble began airing Season 2 on Sunday July 13, 2008, in a 6 pm and midnight timeslot with repeats the following Saturday.

Bulgaria's TV7 aired a dubbed version of season 2 beginning on November 29, 2007, weekdays until December 13, 2007 (actually airing episodes 212 and 213 before they were broadcast in Canada).

Ireland's national broadcaster RTÉ air Whistler on their second channel RTÉ 2 in the early hours of Saturday morning (around 3 am)

MTV2 in Canada began airing season 1 on Friday, August 8 as part of its inaugural program schedule (the cable channel began broadcasting August 1). First airings of episodes are on Fridays with numerous repeats during the week. The channel continued into Season 2 immediately following the last airing of the Season 1 finale. Another CTV network, "A", began airing Season 1 on February 20, 2009, on Fridays at 10 pm local time. Season 2 began airing on "A" on Saturday, September 12, 2009 also at 10 pm local time.

Episode list 
Season 1
 "Fallen"
 "Out of the Shadows"
 "Coming Together, Coming Apart"
 "Lies And Whispers"
 "The Burden Of Truth"
 "Will The Real Beck...?"
 "In The Air"
 "After The Fall"
 "The Looks Of Love"
 "Gathering Clouds"
 "Scratching The Surface"
 "Meltdown"
 "Unearthed"

Season 2
 "Homecoming"
 "Blindside"
 "Hazed And Confused"
 "End Game"
 "Passion Plays"
 "Always A Bridesmaid"
 "Out Of Bounds"
 "Crossroads"
 "Family Ties"
 "Road Trip"
 "The Rules Of Attachment, Part 1"
 "The Rules Of Attachment, Part 2"
 "Last Run"

In addition to the 13 first season broadcast episodes, 13 "webisodes" were produced. They were available on The N's "The Click" website and the CTV Broadband Network. The webisodes were short scenes that depicted an event that took place either between broadcast episodes or during an episode (but not seen during the episode). Because the webisodes were not given official titles by the producers, CTV and The N used different titles to refer to them on their respective websites.

For the second season, 10 "Carrie's web diary webisodes" and 10 "deleted scenes" were produced.

Cast 
Several characters from season one were let go. David Paetkau's character, Beck McKaye, returned as a special guest star in season two. Brandy Ledford's character, Shelby Varland, returned to season two episode one as a special guest star.

Regular

 Nick Lea as Ethan McKaye (Season 1 only)
 Jesse Moss as Quinn McKaye
 David Paetkau as Beck McKaye (Season 1 only, recurring Season 2)
 Amanda Crew as Carrie Miller
 Adam J. Harrington as Ryan McKaye
 Holly Dignard (credited as "Holly Elissa Dignard" in Season 2) as Nicole Miller
 Brendan Penny as AJ Varland (Season 1 only)
 Ingrid Kavelaars as Jen McKaye
 Christopher Shyer as Adrien Varland

Recurring Season 1

 Haley Beauchamp as Feeney
 Brandy Ledford as Shelby Varland
 Andrew Fallows as Steve Newman
 Kandyse McClure as Lisa
 Steve Bacic as Adam Lawson
 Michaela Mann as Isabelle
 Venus Terzo as Melina Sarris
 John Mann as James Kaliciak
 Michael Eklund as Dante
 Tyron Leitso as Detective Rob Randall

Recurring Season 2

 Tamara Hope as Leah Hutton
 Ryan Kennedy as Travis Hollier
 Tommy Lioutas as John "Griff" Griffin
 Ben Cotton as Coach Dean Webber
 Kim Hawthorne as Jada Temple
 Diego Klattenhoff as Derek Brooks
 Janet Wright as Celia
 Tahmoh Penikett as Elias Noth
 Peter Outerbridge as Peter Varland
 Andrew Airlie as Mitchell Douglas
 Scott Hylands as Jonus Varland
 Carly Pope as Bailey

Music 
The musical supervision for Whistler is handled by S.L. Feldman and Associates, the same company that supervised the music for Queer as Folk. Season 1 featured music by such Canadian artists as the Dirtmitts (whose song "Ordinary Day" is featured as the series opening track), The Waking Eyes, The Organ, The Stills, Hawksley Workman, Love and Mathematics, Sam Roberts, Pilot Speed, The High Dials, Death from Above 1979, The Dears, The Meligrove Band, You Say Party, Immaculate Machine, and Autumn Eve. The Canadian punk bank DOA was featured in episode 9, "The Looks of Love," with the songs "I Hate You" and "Liar For Hire." The N Soundtrack, containing some of the music used on the show, was released in August 2006.

Season 2 artists include The Yoko Casionos, Ten Second Epic, Sproll, TV Heart Attack, Kill The Lights, The February March, Jets Overhead and Tim Hanauer. Several of the artists perform "live" on stage in the episodes at the series' Last Run Tavern (previously known as the McKaye Tavern in Season 1).

International broadcasters

References

External links 
 

CTV Television Network original programming
The N original programming
2000s American teen drama television series
2006 American television series debuts
2008 American television series endings
2000s Canadian teen drama television series
2006 Canadian television series debuts
2008 Canadian television series endings
American television soap operas
Canadian television soap operas
Television shows filmed in Vancouver
Television shows set in British Columbia
English-language television shows
Television series by Bell Media